Low-temperature thermal desalination (LTTD) is a desalination technique which takes advantage of the fact that water evaporates at lower temperatures at low pressures, even as low as ambient temperature. This cold water is pumped through coils to condense the evaporated water vapor. The resulting condensate is purified water.

Using waste heat
The LTTD process may also take advantage of the temperature gradient available at thermal power plants, where large quantities of warm cooling water are discharged from the plant, reducing the energy input needed to create a temperature gradient. This technique of making use of waste heat is a form of cogeneration.

History
The principle of LTTD has been known for some time, originally stemming from ocean thermal energy conversion research. Some experiments were conducted in the U.S. and Japan to test low-temperature-driven desalination technology. In Japan, a spray flash evaporation system was developed by Saga University.

Research in India and pilot plants
LTTD was studied by India's National Institute of Ocean Technology (NIOT) from 2004. Their first LTTD plant was opened in 2005 at Kavaratti in the Lakshadweep islands. In 2007, NIOT opened an experimental floating LTTD plant off the coast of Chennai with a capacity of /day. A smaller plant was established in 2009 at the North Chennai Thermal Power Station (a coal-fired power plant) to test the concept using power plant cooling water.

References 

Water desalination